Attukal Pongala is a 10-day religious festival celebrated at the Attukal Bhagavathy Temple in Thiruvananthapuram in the Indian state of Kerala. On the ninth day there is a huge gathering of millions of women on the temple surroundings. These women prepare a divine food made of rice in earthen pots and offer it to the Attukal Amma (Goddess of the Temple). The pongala preparation starts with the ritual called 'Aduppuvettu'. This is the lighting of the pongala hearth (called Pandarayaduppu) placed inside the temple by the chief priest. This is the earliest Pongala festival in Kerala.

The festival is marked as the largest annual gathering of women by the Guinness World Records. The ceremony was set up in Guinness Book of World Records on February 23, 1997, when 1.5 million women participated in Pongala. In 2009, a new Guinness World Records celebrated 2.5 million attendance. This temple is also known as the Sabarimala for Women.

Rituals
On the signal of the main priest of the Attukal Bhagavathy Temple, women light the ritual fires for preparation of sweet customary rice, on prefixed auspicious time, in earthen pots. The entire temple area and its roads are filled with women preparing the customary rice on small hearths in neat rows, which is a wonderful sight and sweet smells emanate the air, spiritually strengthening people's homes. The ceremony is initiated on the auspicious day of Pooram star which coincides with full moon or Purnima. All these rituals occur amidst the beautiful musical rendering of Goddess (Kannaki Charitam) during the Kappukettu ceremony. The main significance is victory of good over evil. The ceremony is concluded in the evening by an aerial showering of flowers, and sprinkling of holy waters, by the temple priests, to honor the most benevolent goddess, Sri Bhadrakali 

The Attukal Pongala was held on March 9, 2020. The Attukal Pongala event started at 10:20AM and ends at 2:10PM with the traditional Nivedyam. Thousands of women participated despite the high alert from the state government against large gatherings due to the COVID-19 pandemic.  The next Attukal Pongala will be held on 7 March 2023.

References

External link

Guinness World Records
Hindu festivals in Kerala
Gatherings of women
Hinduism and women